The Indestructible Choc Boi Nation (abbreviated as TICBN) is a compilation album by recording artists of Nigerian record label Chocolate City. It was released exclusively on the Star Music platform for free digital streaming on April 30, 2015. The album features appearances from Ice Prince, Jesse Jagz, M.I Abaga, Nosa, Ruby Gyang, Victoria Kimani, Pryse, DJ Lambo, DJ Caise, Loose Kaynon, Dice Ailes, Milli and Koker. Its production was handled by Jesse Jagz, Reinhard, L37, Tunday, Teck Zilla, Nosa, DJ Caise and Ckay. The album's release celebrated the merger of Loopy Music and Chocolate City, as well as the return of Jesse Jagz. TICBN was released to the general public two weeks following its exclusive release on Star Music.  It was supported by two singles: "Summer Time" and "Suite 99".

Background and composition
The Indestructible Choc Boi Nation was recorded in 2015. It was released a few weeks after Chocolate City announced a merger with Loopy Music. M.I Abaga partnered with Star Music to promote the album. He said, "We are very proud and excited to enter this new chapter in our individual and collective careers and are particularly delighted to partner with the premier Nigerian music mobile and web platform to bring the music to our fans. We have so much good music for our fans and we are eager to explore this avenue for reaching them".  

"Summertime" is a pleasant ode to everyone's favourite time of the year. In the rap/dancehall mashup "Suite 99", Jesse Jagz reconnects with Ice Prince. "In "Restoration", he addresses his 2013 exit from Chocolate City. The trap record "Oh No No" is infused with warning bells and rattling 808’s. "Do Something" is an ode to Shina Peters's Jùjú music genre of the late 1980s and early 1990s.

Singles
The album's lead single "Summer Time" was released on March 17, 2015. It contains additional vocals by Loose Kaynon and was co-produced by Jesse Jagz and Reinhard. Reviewing for 360nobs, Henre Igwe described the song as a "dashing piece of art in form and style" and said Jesse Jagz's production "inspires hope". Music critic Uche Briggs said the song "doesn't touch the infernal legacy of the Choc Boiz crew". The Jesse Jagz-produced track "Suite 99" was released as the album's second single on April 17, 2015. It was jointly recorded by Jesse Jagz and Ice Prince and contains interpolations by Dr. Dre and Craig Mack.

Critical reception

The Indestructible Choc Boi Nation received positive reviews from music critics. Ayomide Tayo of Pulse Nigeria praised the album's production and said Reinhard "stretches the sound of TICBN, embracing trap, pop, and Naija pop without losing the talents and their innocence on the project". Jim Donnett of TooXclusive called the album "decent" and said the "entire body of work is hardly boundary defying as it doesn't alter practicing trends of the industry neither does it raise the stakes or challenge the status quo". 

Reviewing for Nigerian Entertainment Today, Dayo Showemimo concluded that TICBN  "shows synergy between all the acts and producers as they collaborated to produce great sounds". Wilfred Okiche of 360nobs said, "TICBN isn't a shoo-in for album of the year but it plays way better than the average, vanity inspired label compilation album".

Track listing

Notes
  signifies an additional producer
"Do Something" contains additional vocals by Nosa
"No More" contains additional vocals by Debbie Romeo
"Summer Time" contains additional vocals by Loose Kaynon

Release history

References

M.I albums
Ice Prince albums
Victoria Kimani albums
Chocolate City (music label) albums
Albums produced by Jesse Jagz
Albums produced by Reinhard
Nosa (musician) albums
Jesse Jagz albums
Albums produced by L-37